London Town is a 1946 Technicolor musical film directed by Wesley Ruggles and starring Sid Field and Petula Clark, generally regarded as one of the biggest flops in the history of British cinema.

Plot summary
The screenplay by Sig Herzig, Val Guest, and Elliot Paul, based on a story by director Wesley Ruggles, revolves around comedian Jerry Sanford (Sid Field), who arrives in London believing he has been hired as the star of a major stage production, when in fact he is merely an understudy. Thanks to his daughter Peggy (Petula Clark, already a screen veteran at age fourteen), who sabotages the revue's star Charlie de Haven (Sonnie Hale), he finally gets his big break. The premise allows for a variety of musical numbers and comedy sketches performed by, among others, Kay Kendall in her film debut and Tessie O'Shea.

Cast

 Sid Field as Jerry Sanford
 Greta Gynt as Mrs. Eve Barry
 Petula Clark as Peggy Sanford
 Kay Kendall as Patsy
 Sonnie Hale as Charlie de Haven
 Claude Hulbert as Belgrave, Charlie's dresser
 Mary Clare as Mrs. Gates
 Tessie O'Shea as herself
 Jerry Desmonde as George
 Beryl Davis as Paula
 Scotty McHarg as Bill
 W. G. Fay as Mike
 Reginald Purdell as Stage Manager
 Alfie Dean as Heckler
 Charles Paton as Novelty Shopkeeper
 Pamela Carroll as Street Singer
 Marion Saunders Obligato in 'Street Singer'
 Lucas Hovinga as Dancer 
 Jack Parnell as Drummer
 Sheila Bligh as London Town Dozen & One Girl
 Dorothy Cuff as London Town Dozen & One Girl
 Pat Hughes as London Town Dozen & One Girl
 Sheila Huntington as London Town Dozen & One Girl
 Pauline Johnson as London Town Dozen & One Girl
 Pamela Kay as London Town Dozen & One Girl
 Freda Lansley as London Town Dozen & One Girl
 Mary Midwinter as London Town Dozen & One Girl
 Giselle Morlais as London Town Dozen & One Girl
 Louise Newton as London Town Dozen & One Girl
 Enid Smeeden as London Town Dozen & One Girl
 Pauline Tyler as London Town Dozen & One Girl
 Jackie Watson as London Town Dozen & One Girl
 Stella Hamilton as Dancer (uncredited)
 James Kenney as Extra (uncredited)
 Wally Patch as Constable (uncredited)
 Susan Shaw as Extra (uncredited)
 Ann Sullivan as Singer, Street Scene (uncredited)

Production
The critical and financial failure of the extravagant film, Britain's first major Technicolor musical, is part of British film legend. Financed by the Rank Organisation at a time of rationing and shortages of materials in the period immediately after World War II, it was filmed in the shell of "Sound City Shepperton", which had been made available as a film studio after being requisitioned during the war as a factory for aircraft parts. (The studio was later renamed Shepperton Studios and is still used for film production.)

Musical hall performer Field had cheered up wartime London audiences with his hugely successful stage variety shows, including Strike a New Note (1943), Strike it Again (1944), and Piccadilly Hayride (1946), so he seemed a natural for the lead. As he was of the opinion that no British director was capable of making a good musical, he insisted on having an American at the helm, and the task fell to Wesley Ruggles, who produced as well.

Given that Ruggles had no experience with the genre – his best-known films at that point were the Academy Award-winning Western epic Cimarron (1931) and the Mae West comedy I'm No Angel (1933), both more than a decade old – and his Hollywood career was on a downslide, he was an odd choice indeed.

J. Arthur Rank spent large sums of money for American songwriters (Jimmy Van Heusen and Johnny Burke), musicians (Ted Heath and his orchestra), and costumes by the legendary designer Orry-Kelly, while at the same time re-equipping the studio from the ground up. He was confident that box-office business was booming at the time and that demand for a flashy musical entertainment would be such that he would make a healthy profit, so his financial controls were slack.

Kay Kendall was promoted as England's answer to Lana Turner. "Nobody had ever heard of me but they called me a star", she later recalled. "I opened bazaars, signed autographs, went to premieres, did everything a star was supposed to do. My photograph was on magazine covers and front pages of newspapers. And all before we'd ever finished the picture."

Reception
So much was spent on production that the film needed to perform better than possible just to break even. However, dismissed by critics (who described it as "tacky" and "tasteless") and ignored by audiences, it was a legendary flop. In hindsight, however, especially for nostalgia fans, many of its kitschy aspects make it fascinating, and film historians consider it an interesting record of the times in which it takes place. Following Britain's victory in the war, it can be seen as a tribute to London and its residents, and as a celebration of popular Cockney culture, especially its music hall traditions.

It should also be pointed out that according to trade papers, the film was a "notable box office attraction" at British cinemas in 1946. According to Kinematograph Weekly the 'biggest winner' at the box office in 1946 Britain was The Wicked Lady, with "runners up" being The Bells of St Marys, Piccadilly Incident, The Road to Utopia, Tomorrow is Forever, Brief Encounter, Wonder Man, Anchors Away, Kitty, The Captive Heart, The Corn is Green, Spanish Main, Leave Her to Heaven, Gilda, Caravan, Mildred Pierce, Blue Dahlia, Years Between, O.S.S., Spellbound, Courage of Lassie, My Reputation, London Town, Caesar and Cleopatra, Meet the Navy, Men of Two Worlds, Theirs is the Glory, The Overlanders, and Bedelia.

Kay Kendall said after the film's release there were "no more bazaars to open, no more premieres, no more autographs." However her career later recovered and she became a major star of British films, before dying of leukaemia in 1959 at the age of just 32.

London Town was the starting point for the career of Susan Shaw.

Music
Songs in London Town include "You Can't Keep a Good Dreamer Down", "The 'Ampstead Way" (most definitely inspired by "The Lambeth Walk" from the earlier stage production Me and My Girl), "Any Way the Wind Blows", a medley of Cockney songs ("Knock 'em in the Old Kent Road"/"Any Old Iron"/"Follow the Van"), "Don't Dilly Dally on the Way" (sung by Charles Collins), and "My Heart Goes Crazy", which was the title under which an abridged U.S. version of the film was released by United Artists in 1953.

In September 2006, the film's soundtrack – plus bonus tracks including four early studio recordings by Clark – was released on CD by Sepia Records.

Media
The original two-hour-12 minute version, which never was released commercially, is now available for viewing at the archives at the BFI Southbank.

In September 2011, the full-length version of the film was made commercially available for the first time, when it was released on a PAL DVD by Odeon Entertainment in the U.K. (Running time is listed as 122 mins. on Amazon UK, so that would be shortened. Or, that might simply be running fast at PAL speed, 25 frames per second instead of transferred correctly at film speed of 24 fps.)

References

External links

Review of film at Variety

1946 films
British musical films
Films directed by Wesley Ruggles
1946 musical films
Eagle-Lion Films films
1940s British films